Delaware State University (DSU or Del State) is a public historically black land-grant research university in Dover, Delaware. DSU also has two satellite campuses: one in Wilmington and one in Georgetown. The university encompasses four colleges and a diverse population of undergraduate and advanced-degree students. Delaware State University is classified among "R2: Doctoral Universities – High research activity".

History
The Delaware College for Colored Students was established on May 15, 1891, by the Delaware General Assembly. The name was changed to the State College for Colored Students by state legislative action in 1893 to eliminate confusion with Delaware College, which was attended by whites in Newark, Delaware.  It first awarded degrees in 1898. In 1945, the Middle States Commission on Higher Education awarded the college provisional accreditation. Three years later, the institution became Delaware State College by legislative action. Although its accreditation was revoked in 1949, it was regained in 1957. On July 1, 1993, the institution changed its name yet again, this time to Delaware State University.

Delaware State University is one of the first historically black colleges and universities to have a no-smoking policy.  In 2015 the university began phasing out smoking on campus by restricting it to four designated areas and providing educational resources on smoking cessation tools and programs.  In August 2015 it implemented a completely tobacco-free policy.  In 2017, the university received the ACAS Health Leadership Award in recognition of its efforts.  The award was jointly presented by the Public Health Service Officers Foundation for the Advancement of Public Health, the Truth Initiative, Arizonans Concerned About Smoking and the Arizona NAACP.

In December 2020, MacKenzie Scott donated $20 million to Delaware State University. Her donation is the largest single gift in the university's history.

On July 1, 2021, Delaware State University officially finalized its acquisition of Wesley College, a 157-year-old private institution founded by the Methodist Church in 1873. This acquisition makes Delaware State the first historically Black university to acquire an institution that is not a historically Black college or university. The university has renamed the former Wesley campus "DSU Downtown" (reflecting its close proximity to Downtown Dover) and has relocated most of its College of Health and Behavioral Science (Public and Allied Health, Psychology, and Social Work programs) on that additional 41-acre site. That academic division has been renamed the Wesley College of Health and Behavioral Sciences one way to preserve the history of the former Wesley College.

Campus
The  main campus in Dover, the capital of Delaware, is an approximate two-hour motor drive from Philadelphia, Baltimore, and Washington, D.C., and three hours from New York City. 
There are two satellite campuses in Wilmington and Georgetown.

The main campus in Dover contains thirty buildings, including:

 Administration Building
 Alumni Stadium
 The Bank of America Building
 Delaware Hall
 The Education and Humanities Building & Theatre
 Loockerman Hall - listed on the National Register of Historic Places in 1971.
 The Mishoe Science Center
 Price Building
 Willam C. Jason Library
 The Wellness and Recreation Center
 The Optical Science Center for Applied Research

On the main campus there are five main campus traditional residential halls and three apartment-style residence halls for upperclassmen on campus. Off-campus there is an apartment complex and an residential hall. In addition, the university has activated two residential halls at DSU Downtown (the former Wesley College campus). The residential facilities include:

 Harriet Tubman-Lydia Laws Hall
 Jenkins Hall
 Medgar Evers Hall
 Wynder Towers
 The Living and Learning Commons (off campus)
 University Courtyard Apartments (off campus)
 University Village Complex
 Warren-Franklin Hall 
 Malmberg Hall (DSU Downtown)
 Zimmerman Hall (DSU Downtown)

Two dining halls serve the more than 1,500 on-campus students.

As a part of the Internet2 initiative, the university maintains several research computer laboratories including a high-performance computational cluster in its DESAC center. Almost every building has a computer lab and each student has a dedicated data port for internet access, their own phone, a campus email address, and cable television access in all residence hall rooms. Most campus buildings also offer wireless connectivity.

DSU is one of 148 schools in the country to receive Tree Campus USA recognition from the Arbor Day Foundation. The university owns two farms near Kenton and Smyrna, and has an Airway Science Program based at Delaware Air Park in Cheswold.

Administration

Dr. Tony Allen became the 12th president of Delaware State University on January 1, 2020, after serving the previous two and a half years as the university's provost and executive vice president. Three months into his presidency, Dr. Allen acted decisively upon the onset of the COVID-19 pandemic in mid-March 2020, as he ended in-person classes and residential operations on campus, and marshalled the faculty to get all of their curriculum online to enable students to complete that spring semester virtually online. Under Dr. Allen's leadership, the university raised $1.5 million for a Student Emergency Relief Fund to address student needs brought on by COVID-19 crisis. Although the COVID-19 crisis continued throughout the year, Dr. Allen and the university reopened its residential halls for the fall semester 2020, allowing more than 1,700 students to resume their residency on campus while almost all classes continued to be held virtually.

The business and affairs of the university are governed by the board of trustees. The Board of Trustees has all the powers accorded it by Title 14, Chapter 65 of the Delaware Code. The Board consists of 15 members whose appointment or election is provided for in the Delaware Code, and the governor of the state and the president of the university, both of whom shall be members of the board, ex officio, with the right to vote.

Academics
The university consists of four colleges: 
College of Agriculture, Science & Technology
College of Humanities, Education & Social Sciences
College of Business
College of Health & Behavioral Sciences

The university offers 46 undergraduate degrees, 21 graduate degrees, and six doctoral degrees (interdisciplinary applied mathematics and mathematical physics, applied chemistry, neuroscience and optics, integrative agriculture, food & environment, and educational leadership). The university also offers several cooperative and dual degree programs. Students receive instruction in classes with a 13:1 student-to-faculty ratio. About 83 percent of undergraduates receive scholarships, grants, loans or work-study income. It has a traditional Honors Program and a Minority Access to Research Careers (MARC) Honors Program to increase the number of students in science interested in pursuing biomedical research and obtaining doctor of philosophy degrees in biology, chemistry, physics, mathematics, computer science, and biopsychology.

In addition to satisfying the requirements for the major or majors and any minor, all undergraduates are required to complete the General Education Program, which includes: seven core courses, twelve foundation courses (across the curriculum), and the Senior Capstone Experience.

Accreditations include the Middle States Commission on Higher Education (MSCHE), the Accreditation Commission for Education in Nursing (ACEN), the Council on Social Work Education (CSWE), the Accreditation Council for Programs in Hospitality Administration (ACPHA), the National Council for Accreditation of Teacher Education (NCATE), and the Commission on Accreditation for Dietetic Education (CCDE). The university's College of Business is accredited nationally and internationally by the Association to Advance Collegiate Schools of Business (AACSB).

Aviation program
DSU's Aviation Program provides students with education and experience in preparation for careers in the aviation industry. Curricula in the program lead to a B.Sc. degree with concentrations in Aviation Management or Professional Pilot. Professional Pilot graduates will complete their Federal Aviation Administration (FAA) requirements for Private Pilot, Instrument, Commercial, Multi-Engine and Certified Flight Instructor ratings while earning their bachelor's degree.

Delaware State operates the only full-service, university-based flight school in the mid-Atlantic area. The Aviation program is approved by the State of Delaware Education Department for Veterans Flight Training.

Research
The institution has greatly increased its research endeavors over the past several years, as it has developed the research infrastructure needed to attract federal grants for projects in the following DSU Research Centers and in the sciences and mathematics:

Applied Mathematics Research Center
Center for Applied Optics
Center for Research and Education in Optical Sciences and Applications (CREOSA) (a National Science Foundation-Center for Research Excellence (NSF-CREST))
Center for Applied Optics for Space Science (CAOSS) (a National Aeronautics and Space Administration University Research Center (NASA-URC))
Delaware Center for Scientific and Applied Computation

Rankings

DSU is ranked 8th among the Historically Black Colleges and Universities in the U.S. News & World Report (2023).

In 2018, the College of Business at DSU was named to the Princeton Review's Best Business Schools for the tenth consecutive year (2009-2018).

Global connections
The university has over thirty formal international partnerships with institutions in countries including China, Cuba, Egypt, France, Italy, Japan, Korea, Mexico, Nigeria, Poland and the UK which facilitate  research and conference collaborations as well as student exchanges.

Student activities

Athletics 

The university fields teams, who are known as the Hornets, in:

Men's

Baseball
Basketball
Football
Cross Country
Track and field (Indoor and Outdoor)

Women's

Basketball
Bowling
Cross Country
Equestrian
Golf
Lacrosse
Soccer
Softball
Track and field (Indoor and Outdoor)
Tennis
Volleyball

The athletic programs participate in the National Collegiate Athletic Association's (NCAA)'s Division I (FCS for football). The Hornets compete in the Mid-Eastern Athletic Conference as full members since the conference was founded in 1970.

The university's Department of Intramural Sports provides a wide variety of quality recreational programs for students, faculty and staff.

Student organizations
Delaware State has over 60 student organizations on campus including a Student Government Association (SGA), gospel choir, and The Approaching Storm Marching Band.

Notable alumni

References

Further reading

External links

Delaware State Athletics website

 
Historically black universities and colleges in the United States
Land-grant universities and colleges
Public universities and colleges in Delaware
Educational institutions established in 1891
Education in Kent County, Delaware
Buildings and structures in Dover, Delaware
Tourist attractions in Kent County, Delaware
1891 establishments in Delaware